The 1935 Tamworth by-election was held on 10 May 1935.  The by-election was held due to the death of the incumbent Conservative MP, Sir Arthur Ramsay-Steel-Maitland.  It was won by the Conservative candidate John Mellor.

References

1935 elections in the United Kingdom
1935 in England
20th century in Staffordshire
May 1935 events
By-elections to the Parliament of the United Kingdom in Staffordshire constituencies
Unopposed by-elections to the Parliament of the United Kingdom (need citation)
Politics of Tamworth, Staffordshire